Virtual reality applications are applications that make use of virtual reality (VR), an immersive sensory experience that digitally simulates a virtual environment. Applications have been developed in a variety of domains, such as education, architectural and urban design, digital marketing and activism, engineering and robotics, entertainment, virtual communities, fine arts, healthcare and clinical therapies, heritage and archaeology, occupational safety, social science and psychology.

Architecture and urban design 
One of the first recorded uses of virtual reality in architecture was in the late 1990s when the University of North Carolina virtually modelled Sitterman Hall, home of its computer science department. Designers wore a headset and used a hand controller to simulate moving around a virtual space. With an Autodesk Revit model they could "walk through" a schematic. VR enables architects to better understand the details of a project such as the transition of materials, sightlines, or visually displays of wall stress, wind loads, solar heat gain, or other engineering factors. By 2010, VR programs had been developed for urban regeneration, planning and transportation projects.  Entire cities were simulated in VR.

Industrial design 
Virtual reality and artificial intelligence are used by automotive firms like Porsche and BMW to optimize their production chain. Software developers are building VR solutions to skip redundant design workflow phases and meet end-user expectations faster and more accurately.

Restorative nature experiences 

Studies on exposure to nature environments shows how it is able to produce relaxation, recover attention capacity and cognitive function, reduce stress and stimulate positive mood.

Immersive virtual reality technology is able to replicate believable restorative nature experiences, either using 360 degree video footage or environments created from 3D real-time rendering often developed using game engines (for example Unreal Engine or Unity) This is useful for users who are deprived from accessing certain areas, due to e.g. physical restraints or complications, such as senior citizens or nursing home residents. Restorative virtual environments are able replicate and mediate real world experiences using video footage, replicate these using 3D rendering or can be based loosely on real world environment using real-time 3D rendering.

Healthcare and medical 

VR began to appear in rehabilitation in the 2000s. For Parkinson's disease, evidence of its benefits compared to other rehabilitation methods is lacking. A 2018 review on the effectiveness of VR mirror therapy and robotics found no benefit. Virtual reality exposure therapy (VRET) is a form of exposure therapy for treating anxiety disorders such as post traumatic stress disorder (PTSD) and phobias. Studies have indicated that combining VRET with behavioral therapy, patients experience a reduction of symptoms. In some cases, patients no longer met the DSM-V criteria for PTSD.

Virtual reality is also tested in the field of behavioral activation therapy. BA therapy encourages patient to change their mood by scheduling positive activities into the day-to-day life. Due to a lack of access to trained providers, physical constraints or financial reasons, many patients are not able to attend BA therapy. Researchers are trying to overcome these challenges by providing BA via virtual reality. The idea of the concept is to enable especially elderly adults to participate in engaging activities that they wouldn't be able to attend without VR. Possibly, the so called "BA-inspired VR protocols" will mitigate the lower mood, life satisfaction, and likelihood of depressions.

Furthermore researchers are using VR to study how people with social anxiety learn and make decisions. Aim is to improve interventions of anxiety disorders.

Immersive VR can motivate exercise with challenged sedentary users, such as for rehabilitation centers or senior citizen homes, increasing quality of life and independence through increased physical activity (see right image). Immersive VR has also been shown useful for acute pain management, on the theory that it may distract people, reducing their experience of pain.

Some companies and researchers are adapting VR for fitness, either motivating physical therapy or exercise, e.g. by contextualizing e.g. biking through VR-based experiences (see right image), or by using gamification concepts to encourage exercise.

Research has shown that dementia patients given virtual reminiscence therapy reduced incidences of dementia related symptoms. Virtual reminiscence therapy allows for creating virtual environments tailored to the patient allowing them to remember old memories more easily which may improve overall quality of life. Developments in VR usage in dementia could also make psychological therapies for dementia more cost-effective by providing alternate sources of stimulation that are cheaper and work better.

Virtual reality and surgery 
The first collaborative virtual reality surgery was successfully performed June 2022, in Brazil by paediatric surgeron Noor ul Owase Jeelani, of Great Ormond Street Hospital in London. The surgery, a separation of conjoined twins, was conducted collaboratively in a 'virtual reality room' by Dr. Jeelani and Dr. Gabriel Mufarrej, head of paediatric surgery at Instituto Estadual do Cerebro Paulo Niemeyer in Brazil.

Virtual reality medical simulation training 
With the rise of COVID-19 in 2020, opportunities for clinical training and education were greatly reduced due to the lack of availability of clinical educators and the need to establish social distancing by avoiding in-person interaction.

Digital marketing 
Virtual reality presents an opportunity and an alternative channel for digital marketing. International Data Corporation expected spending to increase for augmented and virtual reality, forecasting a compound annual growth rate of 198% in 2015–2020. Revenues were expected to rise to $143.3 billion in 2020. Global spending on digital advertisements was forecast to increase to $335.5 billion by 2020. A 2015 study found that 75% of companies on Forbes' World's Most Valuable Brands list had developed a VR or AR experience. Although VR is not widespread among consumers compared to other forms of digital media, many companies have invested in VR. Some companies adopted VR to enhance workplace collaboration.

VR can present high definition, three-dimensional interactive imaging. Its marketing benefits were observed by Suh and Lee through via laboratory experiments: with a VR interface, participants' product knowledge and product attitude noticeably increased. VR marketing can engage consumers' emotions. Both studies indicate an increased desire to purchase products marketed through VR; however, these benefits showed minimal return on investment (ROI). Suh and Lee found that products that are primarily experienced through hearing and vision (but not others) benefit more from VR marketing.

Ads that appear during a VR experience (interruption marketing) may be considered invasive. Consumers want to decide whether to accept an ad. Organizations can for example require the user to download a mobile app before experiencing their VR campaign.

Non-profit organizations have used VR to bring potential supporters closer to distant social, political and environmental issues in immersive ways not possible with traditional media. Panoramic views of the conflict in Syria and face-to-face encounters with CGI tigers in Nepal are some examples.

Retailers use VR to show how a product will fit in consumers' homes. Consumers looking at digital photos of the products can virtually spin the product to view it from the side or back.

Architectural design firms allow clients to tour virtual models of proposed buildings. Architects can use VR to experience their developing designs. VR models can replace scale models. Developers and owners can create VR models of existing structures.

Education and training 

VR is used to help learners develop skills without the real-world consequences of failing, especially useful in realms with life-or-death implications. The specific device used to provide the VR experience, whether it be through a mobile phone or desktop computer, does not appear to impact on any educational benefit.

In recent case studies the VR training approach not only proofs better understanding, but also higher satisfaction amongst students. The number of errors can be reduced and the completion time for specific tasks can be shortened.

An increasing number of companies rely on virtual reality when it comes to onboarding of employees. VR onboarding is cheaper and more efficient compared to conventional training, as no demo equipment is required.

Mining Industry 
Many mining accidents can be attributed to inadequate or insufficient training. With virtual reality training, one may simulate the exposure to a real working environment, without the associated risk.

Flight and vehicular applications 
Flight simulators are a form of VR training. They can range from a fully enclosed module to computer monitors providing the pilot's point of view. Driving simulations can train tank drivers on the basics before allowing them to operate the real vehicle. Similar principles are applied in truck driving simulators for specialized vehicles such as fire trucks. As these drivers often have limited opportunity for real-world experience, VR training provides additional training time.

Medicine 
VR technology has many useful applications in the medical field. Through VR, novice surgeons have the ability to practice complex surgeries without stepping into the operating room. Physicians who experience VR simulations improved their dexterity and performance in the operating room significantly more than control groups. VR can produce a three-dimensional representation of a particular patient's anatomy that allows surgeons to map out the surgery ahead of time. Trainees may use real instruments and video equipment to practice in simulated surgeries. Through the revolution of computational analysis abilities, fully immersive VR models are currently available in neurosurgery training. Ventriculostomy catheters insertion, endoscopic and endovascular simulations are used in neurosurgical residency training centers across the world. Experts see VR training as an essential part of the curriculum of future training of neurosurgeons.

Military 

In 1982 Thomas A. Furness III presented the United States Air Force with a working model of his virtual flight simulator, the Visually Coupled Airborne Systems Simulator (VCASS). The second phase of his project, which he called the "Super Cockpit", added high-resolution (for the time) graphics and a responsive display. The United Kingdom has been using VR in military training since the 1980s. The United States military announced the Dismounted Soldier Training System in 2012. It was cited as the first fully immersive military VR training system.

Virtual training environments have been claimed to increase realism while minimizing cost, e.g., by saving ammunition. In 2016, researchers at the U.S. Army Research Laboratory reported that instructor feedback is necessary for virtual training. Virtual training has been used for combined arms training and instructing soldiers to learn when to shoot.

Military programs such as Battle Command Knowledge Systems (BCKS) and Advanced Soldier Sensor Information and Technology (ASSIST) were intended to assist the development of virtual technology. Described goals of the ASSIST initiative were to develop software and wearable sensors for soldiers to improve battlefield awareness and data collection. Researchers stated that these programs would allow the soldier to update their virtual environment as conditions change. Virtual Battlespace 3 (VBS3, successor to the earlier versions named VBS1 and VBS2) is a widely used military training solution adapted from a commercial off the shelf product. Live, Virtual, Constructive – Integrated Architecture (LVC-IA) is a U.S. military technology that allows for multiple training systems to work together to create an integrated training environment. Reported primary uses of the LVC-IA were live training, virtual training, and constructive training. In 2014, the LVC-IA version 1.3 included VBS3.

Space 
NASA has used VR technology for decades. Most notable is their use of immersive VR to train astronauts before flights. VR simulations include exposure to zero-gravity work environments, training on how to spacewalk and tool usage using low-cost tool mock-ups.

High School and College Education 

Immersive virtual reality is used in the High school classroom as a tool to help students learn and be immersed in their subject matter. Immersive virtual reality has been used to teach students interactive history lessons and STEM subjects such as physics. In some cases, virtual reality laboratories have been set in up in schools to provide students with immersive virtual reality experiences focused on specific curriculum outcomes and subject matter. Through virtual reality mediums such as Google Cardboard, foreign languages have also been taught in the classroom by teachers. These few examples, showcase some of the applications of virtual reality and immersive virtual reality in the secondary classroom. Virtual reality is also being applied at the collegiate level to help enhance student education in core subjects such as science, geography, and history.

Engineering and robotics 
In the mid-to-late 1990s 3D computer-aided design (CAD) data took over when video projectors, 3D tracking and computer technology enabled its use in virtual reality environments. Active shutter glasses and multi-surface projection units appeared. Virtual reality has been used in automotive, aerospace, and ground transportation original equipment manufacturers. Virtual reality aids prototyping, assembly, service and performance use-cases. This enables engineers from different disciplines to experience their design. Engineers can view the bridge, building or other structure from any angle. Simulations allow engineers to test their structure's resistance to winds, weight, and other elements.

Virtual reality can control robots in telepresence, teleoperation and telerobotic systems. VR has been used in experiments that investigate how robots can be applied as an intuitive human user interface. Another example is remotely-controlled robots in dangerous environments.

Entertainment

Video games 

Early commercial virtual reality headsets were released for gaming during the early-mid 1990s. These included the Virtual Boy, Cybermaxx and VFX1 Headgear. Since 2010, commercial headsets for VR gaming include the Oculus Rift, HTC Vive and PlayStation VR. The Samsung Gear VR is an example of a phone-based device.

Other modern examples of VR for gaming include the Wii Remote, the Kinect, and the PlayStation Move/PlayStation Eye, all of which track and send player motions to the game. Many devices complement VR with controllers or haptic feedback. VR-specific and VR versions of popular video games have been released.

Cinema 
Films produced for VR permit the audience to view scenes in 360 degrees. This can involve the use of VR cameras to produce interactive films and series. Pornography makers use VR, usually for POV-style porn.

The 2016 World Chess Championship match between Magnus Carlsen and Sergey Karjakin was promoted as "the first in any sport to be broadcast in 360-degree virtual reality." However, a VR telecast featuring Oklahoma hosting Ohio State, preceded it on September 17, 2016. The telecasts (which used roughly 180 degrees of rotation, not the 360 required for full VR) were made available through paid smartphone apps and head-mounted displays.

Music 
VR can allow individuals to virtually attend concerts. VR concerts can be enhanced using feedback from the user's heartbeat and brainwaves. Virtual reality can be used for other forms of music, such as music videos and music visualization or visual music applications.

Family entertainment centers 
In 2015 roller coasters and theme parks began to incorporate VR to match visual effects with haptic feedback. The Void is a theme park in Pleasant Grove, Utah that offers VR attractions that stimulate multiple senses. In March 2018, a VR water slide was launched using a waterproof headset.

Virtual communities 
Large virtual communities have formed around social virtual worlds that can be accessed with VR technologies. Popular examples include VRChat, Rec Room, and AltspaceVR, but also social virtual worlds that were originally developed without support for VR, for example Roblox.

Fine arts 

David Em was the first fine artist to create navigable virtual worlds, in the 1970s. His early work was done on mainframes at Information International, Inc., Jet Propulsion Laboratory, and California Institute of Technology. Jeffrey Shaw with Legible City in 1988 and Matt Mullican with Five into One in 1991, were among the first to exhibit elaborate VR artworks.

Virtopia was the first VR artwork to premiere at a film festival. Created by artist/researcher Jacquelyn Ford Morie with researcher Mike Goslin, it debuted at the 1992 Florida Film Festival. A more developed version of the project appeared at the 1993 Florida Film Festival. Other artists to explore the early artistic potential of VR through the 1990s include Jeffrey Shaw, Ulrike Gabriel, Char Davies, Maurice Benayoun, Knowbotic Research, Rebecca Allen and Perry Hoberman.

The first Canadian virtual reality film festival was the FIVARS Festival of International Virtual & Augmented Reality Stories, founded in 2015 by Keram Malicki-Sánchez. In 2016, the first Polish VR program, The Abakanowicz Art Room was realized – it documented the art office of Magdalena Abakanowicz, made by Jarosław Pijarowski and Paweł Komorowski. Some museums have begun making some of their content virtual reality accessible including the British Museum and the Guggenheim.

Great Paintings VR is a fully immersive virtual reality museum on Steam. It provides more than 1000 famous paintings from different museums of all over the world.

Heritage and archaeology 
Virtual reality enables heritage sites to be recreated. The sites may have restricted or no access for the public, such as caves, damaged/destroyed structures, or sensitive environments that are closed to allow them to recover from overuse.

The first use of VR in a heritage application was in 1994 when a museum visitor interpretation provided an interactive "walk-through" of a 3D reconstruction of Dudley Castle in England as it was in 1550. This consisted of a computer controlled laserdisc-based system designed by engineer Colin Johnson. The system was featured in a conference held by the British Museum in November 1994.

Occupational safety 
VR simulates real workplaces for occupational safety and health (OSH) purposes. Within work scenarios, for example, some parts of a machine move of their own accord while others can be moved by human operators. Perspective, angle of view, and acoustic and haptic properties change according to where the operator is standing and how he or she moves relative to the environment.

VR can be used for OSH purposes to:

 Review and improve the usability of products and processes during design and development.
 Safely test potentially hazardous products, processes and safety concepts.
 Identify cause-effect relationships following accidents on and involving products. This saves material, personnel, time and financial outlay associated with in-situ testing.

Social science and psychology 
Virtual reality offers social scientists and psychologists a cost-effective tool to study and replicate interactions in a controlled environment. It allows an individual to embody an avatar. "Embodying" another being presents a different experience from simply imagining that you are someone else. Researchers have used immersion to investigate how digital stimuli can alter human perception, emotion and physiological states, and how can change social interactions, in addition to studying how digital interaction can enact social change in the physical world.

Altering perception, emotion and physiological states 
Studies have considered how the form we take in virtual reality can affect our perception and actions. One study suggested that embodying the body of a child can cause objects to be perceived as much larger otherwise. Another study found that white individuals who embodied the form of a dark-skinned avatar performed a drumming task with a more varied style than otherwise.

Research exploring perception, emotions and physiological responses within VR suggest that virtual environments can alter how a person responds to stimuli. For example, a virtual park coupled affects subjects' anxiety levels. Similarly, simulated driving through dark areas in a virtual tunnel can induce fear. Social interaction with virtual characters has been shown to produce physiological responses such as changes in heart rate and galvanic skin responses.

Research suggests that a strong presence can facilitate an emotional response, and this emotional response can further increase the feeling of presence. Similarly, breaks in the presence (or a loss in the sense of presence) can cause physiological changes.

Understanding biases and stereotypes 
Researchers have utilized embodied VR perspective-taking to evaluate whether changing a person's self-representation may help in reducing bias against particular social groups. However, the nature of any relationship between embodiment and bias is not yet defined. Individuals who embodied old people demonstrated a significant reduction in negative stereotyping when compared with individuals embodying young people. Similarly, light-skinned individuals placed in dark-bodied avatars showed a reduction in their implicit racial bias. However, other research has shown individuals taking the form of a black avatar had higher levels of implicit racial bias favoring whites after leaving the virtual environment.

Investigating basal mental abilities like Spatial Cognition 
One of the most general abilities in order to perform in everyday life is Spatial Cognition, which involves orientation, navigation etc. Especially in the field of its investigation, virtual reality became an invaluable tool, since it allows to test the performance of subjects in an environment which is highly-immersive and controllable at the same time.

Furthermore, the newest head-mounted displays allow also the implementation of eye-tracking, which provides precious insight in cognitive processes, for example in terms of attention.

Fostering the human griefing process
Starting in the early 2020s, virtual reality has also been discussed as a technological setting that may support people's griefing process, based on digital recreations of deceased individuals. In 2021, this practice received particular media attention following a South Korean TV documentary, which invited a griefing mother to interact with a virtual replica of her deceased daughter. Subsequently, scientists have debated several potential implications of such endeavours, including its potential to facilitate adaptive mourning behavior, but also many ethical challenges involved.

Obstacles  
, motion sickness is still a major issue for virtual reality. The delay between a motion and the updating of the screen image is the source. Users often report discomfort. One study reported that all 12 participants complained of at least two side effects while three had to withdraw from severe nausea and dizziness.

Along with motion sickness, users can also become distracted by the new technology hardware. A study showed how when VR was incorporated into a laboratory environment, the students felt more engaged with the concept, but retained less information due to the new distraction.

Virtual reality users remove themselves from the physical environment. This creates a risk that the user will experience a mishap while moving. Immersion in a virtual world has the potential for social exclusion that may decrease positive mood and increase anger. Behavior in virtual reality may have lasting psychological impact when returning to the physical world. Russian news agency, TASS, reported in 2017, a death from VR use, when a 44-year old man "tripped and crashed into a glass table, suffered wounds and died on the spot from a loss of blood". It is thought to be the first death from VR use.

Philosopher David Pearce argues that even with the most sophisticated VR, “there is no evidence that our subjective quality of life would on average significantly surpass the quality of life of our hunter-gatherer ancestors”. According to Pearce, without genetically reprogramming the negative feedback mechanisms of the brain, one returns to one’s baseline level of happiness or ill-being, which is determined by one’s genes and life history. He thus argues that VR, like any other “purely environmental improvement”, cannot deliver a sustainable level of elevated happiness on its own.

References 

Virtual reality
Virtual reality